Bude Town Football Club is a football club based in Bude, Cornwall, England. They are currently members of the South West Peninsula League Premier Division East and play at Broadclose Park, Bude.

History
Bude Town were formed in 1901. Prior to the 1990s, Bude joined the East Cornwall League, playing in the league until 2005, when they were relegated to the Duchy League. In 2006, the club was promoted back into the East Cornwall League. In 2013, Bude were promoted into the South West Peninsula League. In 2019, the club became founder members of the St Piran League. In 2022, the club was admitted into the South West Peninsula League Premier Division West.

Ground
The club currently play at Broadclose Park, Bude, having played at the site since they were formed.

References

Bude
Association football clubs established in 1901
1901 establishments in England
Football clubs in England
Football clubs in Cornwall
East Cornwall League
Duchy League
South West Peninsula League
Devon Football League